Tawanchai P.K. Saenchai Muaythaigym (born April 7, 1999) is a Thai Muay Thai fighter. As of December 2021 he is the number 2 pound-for-pound Muay Thai fighter in the world according to The Nation. A former Lumpinee Stadium fighter of the year, he competes in the Featherweight division of ONE Championship, where he is the current ONE Muay Thai Featherweight World Champion.

Biography

Tawanchai was born in Pattaya, he started his fighting career at Petchrungruang gym under the name Jatukam Petchrungruang when he was 8 years old. He moved to Bangkok and made his debut in Lumpinee Stadium at the age of 14.

In 2015, Tawanchai moved to P.K.Saenchaimuaythaigym in Southern Bangkok.

He quickly made a name for himself and jumped up multiple weight classes at a time. In 2017 he won the Thailand 126 lbs Title by defeating Wayunoi Petchkiatpetch.

On September 7, 2018 Tawanchai defeated Muay Thai Fighter of the Year 2017 Kulabdam Sor Jor Piekuthai. Kulabdam and his team were convinced that he could win a rematch and negotiated for another fight only weeks later, Tawanchai won again and went into the trilogy fight with confidence. Tawanchai would end up winning all three fights and the 6 million baht worth of side bet during the third fight, positioning himself as one of the best fighters in the country. For his results during the year 2018 he received multiple fighter of the year awards.

He would confirm his status on March 26, 2019 with a stoppage win over Sangmanee Sor Tienpo at the Parunchai Birthday show, Sangmanee never had been stopped in his career. Sangmanee won the rematch by decision 3 months later, handing his first loss to Tawanchai in almost 2 years.

On July 27, 2019 Tawanchai fought for the first time under kickboxing rules for the Wu Lin Feng World Cup in China, it was his first fight outside of Thailand and he won by decision.

ONE Championship
On October 4, 2020, it was announced that Tawanchai had signed with ONE Championship.

Tawanchai faced Sean Clancy at ONE Championship: Dangal on May 15, 2021. He won the bout via head kick knockout at the beginning of the third round.

Tawanchai was originally scheduled to face Saemapetch Fairtex at ONE Championship: Battleground 3. However, Saemapetch was forced to withdraw from the event after one of his cornermen tested positive for COVID-19. He will now fight Sitthichai Sitsongpeenong at ONE Championship: Battleground 3 under Muay Thai rules. Their pre-recorded match will be aired on August 27, 2021. Tawanchai lost the fight by split decision.

Tawanchai faced Saemapetch Fairtex at ONE: Heavy Hitters on January 14, 2022. He won the bout via right hook knockout in the first round.

Tawanchai faced Niclas Larsen at ONE 158 on June 3, 2022. He won the bout after knocking out Larsen in the second round with a left cross.

ONE Featherweight Muay Thai World Champion
Tawanchai faced Petchmorakot Petchyindee Academy for the ONE Featherweight Muay Thai World Championship at ONE 161 on September 29, 2022. He won the fight by unanimous decision.

Tawanchai made his first title defense against Jamal Yusupov on February 25, 2023, at ONE Fight Night 7. He won the bout via a leg kick knockout in the first round.

Titles and accomplishments
ONE Championship
 ONE Featherweight Muay Thai World Championship (One time; current) (1 Defense)
Performance
of the Night (Two times) 
2022 Muay Thai Fighter of the Year
2022 Breakout Star of the Year
Lumpinee Stadium
 2018 Lumpinee Stadium Fighter of the Year
Professional Boxing Association of Thailand (PAT) 
 2017 Thailand 126 lbs champion
Nai Khanom Tom
 2018 Nai Khanom Tom Champion

Awards
 2018 Sports Authority of Thailand Fighter of the Year
 2018 Siam Kela Fighter of the Year Award

Fight record

|-  style="background:#cfc;"
| 2023-02-25 ||Win||align=left| Jamal Yusupov || ONE Fight Night 7 || Bangkok, Thailand || KO (Leg Kick) || 1 || 0:49 
|-
! style=background:white colspan=9 |

|-  style="background:#cfc;"
|  ||Win||align=left| Petchmorakot Petchyindee Academy || ONE 161 || Kallang, Singapore ||  Decision (Unanimous) || 5 || 3:00
|-
! style=background:white colspan=9 |
|-  style="background:#cfc;"
| 2022-06-03|| Win ||align=left| Niclas Larsen || ONE 158 || Kallang, Singapore || KO (Left Cross) || 2 || 1:42
|-  style="background:#cfc;"
| 2022-01-14|| Win ||align=left| Saemapetch Fairtex || ONE: Heavy Hitters || Kallang, Singapore || KO (Left Cross) || 1 || 2:55 
|-  style="background:#fbb;"
| 2021-08-27|| Loss|| align=left| Sitthichai Sitsongpeenong || ONE: Battleground 3 || Kallang, Singapore || Decision (Split)  ||3  ||3:00
|-  style="background:#cfc;"
| 2021-05-15|| Win || align=left| Sean Clancy || ONE: Dangal || Kallang, Singapore || KO (Head Kick) || 3 || 0:35
|-  style="background:#cfc;"
| 2020-09-26|| Win ||align=left| Sangmanee Sor Tienpo || Rueso Fight + Kiatpetch || Narathiwat Province, Thailand || Decision|| 5 || 3:00
|-  style="background:#cfc;"
| 2020-08-16|| Win ||align=left| Nuenglanlek Jitmuangnon || Channel 7 Boxing Stadium || Bangkok, Thailand || Decision || 5 || 3:00
|-  style="background:#fbb;"
| 2020-01-11 ||Loss ||align=left| Jia Aoqi || Wu Lin Feng 2020: -67kg World Cup 2019-2020 Final, Semi Final|| Zhuhai, China ||TKO (Punches)  || 2 ||
|-  style="background:#cfc;"
| 2019-11-30|| Win ||align=left| David Mejia || Wu Lin Feng 2019: -67kg World Cup 2019-2020 6th Group Stage || Zhengzhou, China || Ext.R Decision (Split) || 4 || 3:00
|-  style="background:#cfc;"
| 2019-09-29|| Win ||align=left| Ji Xiang ||Wu Lin Feng 2019: -67kg World Cup 2019-2020 4th Group Stage  || Zhengzhou, China || Decision (Unanimous) || 3 || 3:00
|-  style="background:#cfc;"
| 2019-09-06|| Win ||align=left| Chujaroen Dabransarakarm || Lumpinee Stadium || Bangkok, Thailand || Decision || 5 || 3:00
|-  style="background:#cfc;"
| 2019-07-27|| Win ||align=left| Zhang Wensheng || Wu Lin Feng 2019: -67kg World Cup 2019-2020 2nd Group Stage  || Zhengzhou, China || Decision (Split) || 3 || 3:00
|-  style="background:#fbb;"
| 2019-06-26|| Loss ||align=left| Sangmanee Sor Tienpo || RuamponkonSamui + Kiatpetch Super Fight || Surat Thani, Thailand || Decision || 5 || 3:00
|-  style="background:#cfc;"
| 2019-03-26|| Win ||align=left| Sangmanee Sor Tienpo || Parunchai Birthday || Thung Song, Thailand || KO (High Kick) || 4 || 1:45
|-  style="background:#cfc;"
| 2018-12-07|| Win ||align=left| Nuenglanlek Jitmuangnon || Lumpinee Stadium || Bangkok, Thailand || TKO (Referee Stoppage) || 5 || 0:40 
|-  bgcolor="#cfc"
|-  style="background:#cfc;"
| 2018-11-08|| Win ||align=left| Kulabdam Sor.Jor.Piek-U-Thai || Lumpinee Stadium || Bangkok, Thailand || Decision || 5 || 3:00 
|-
! style=background:white colspan=9 |
|-  style="background:#cfc;"
| 2018-10-05|| Win ||align=left| Kulabdam Sor.Jor.Piek-U-Thai || Muay Thai Expo: The Legend of Muay Thai || Buriram, Thailand || Decision || 5 || 3:00 
|-  bgcolor="#cfc"
|-  style="background:#cfc;"
| 2018-09-07|| Win ||align=left| Kulabdam Sor.Jor.Piek-U-Thai || Lumpinee Stadium || Bangkok, Thailand || Decision || 5 || 3:00 
|-  bgcolor="#cfc"
|-  style="background:#cfc;"
| 2018-07-10|| Win ||align=left| Nuenglanlek Jitmuangnon || Lumpinee Stadium || Bangkok, Thailand || Decision || 5 || 3:00 
|-  bgcolor="#cfc"
|-  style="background:#cfc;"
| 2018-06-05|| Win ||align=left| Ferrari Jakrayanmuaythai || Lumpinee Stadium || Bangkok, Thailand || Decision || 5 || 3:00
|-  style="background:#cfc;"
| 2018-03-28|| Win ||align=left| Yok Parunchai || WanParunchai + Poonseua Sanjorn || Nakhon Si Thammarat, Thailand || Decision || 5 || 3:00 
|-  bgcolor="#cfc"
|-  style="background:#cfc;"
| 2017-12-26|| Win ||align=left| Yok Parunchai || Lumpinee Stadium || Bangkok, Thailand || Decision || 5 || 3:00 
|-  bgcolor="#cfc"
|-  style="background:#cfc;"
| 2017-11-25|| Win ||align=left| Mongkolchai Kwaitonggym || Kriatpetch Super Fight || Krabi, Thailand || Decision || 5 || 3:00
|-  style="background:#cfc;"
| 2017-09-09|| Win ||align=left| Mongkolchai Kwaitonggym || Lumpinee Stadium || Bangkok, Thailand || Decision || 5 || 3:00
|-  style="background:#fbb;"
| 2017-08-06|| Loss ||align=left| Mongkolchai Kwaitonggym || Channel 7 Boxing Stadium || Bangkok, Thailand || Decision || 5 || 3:00
|-  style="background:#cfc;"
| 2017-06-09|| Win ||align=left| Chalam Parunchai || Lumpinee Stadium || Bangkok, Thailand || Decision || 5 || 3:00 
|-  bgcolor="#cfc"
|-  style="background:#c5d2ea;"
| 2017-04-27|| Draw ||align=left| Phetwason Ansukhumvit || Lumpinee Stadium || Bangkok, Thailand || Decision || 5 || 3:00 
|-  bgcolor="#cfc"
|-  style="background:#fbb;"
| 2017-03-28|| Loss ||align=left| Tito Hoywanpohchana || Lumpinee Stadium || Bangkok, Thailand || Decision || 5 || 3:00 
|-  bgcolor="#cfc"
|-  style="background:#cfc;"
| 2017-02-18|| Win ||align=left| Wayunoi Phetkiatphet || Lumpinee Stadium || Bangkok, Thailand || Decision || 5 || 3:00 
|-  bgcolor="#cfc"
! style=background:white colspan=9 |
|-  style="background:#cfc;"
| 2016-11-29|| Win ||align=left| Kumantong Jitmuangnon || Lumpinee Stadium || Bangkok, Thailand || Decision || 5 || 3:00
|-  style="background:#cfc;"
| 2016-10-01|| Win ||align=left| Worrawut M.U.Den || Lumpinee Stadium || Bangkok, Thailand || Decision || 5 || 3:00
|-  style="background:#fbb;"
| 2016-08-23|| Loss ||align=left| Wanmechok Puhongtong || Lumpinee Stadium || Bangkok, Thailand || Decision || 5 || 3:00
|-  style="background:#cfc;"
| 2016-07-17|| Win ||align=left| ChaiLar Por.Lukbun || Channel 7 Boxing Stadium  || Bangkok, Thailand || KO || 4 ||
|-  style="background:#cfc;"
| 2016-06-17|| Win ||align=left| Singtongnoi Kiatkittipan || Lumpinee Stadium || Bangkok, Thailand || KO || 4 ||
|-  style="background:#fbb;"
| 2016-05-03|| Loss ||align=left| Nongview Phetkoson || Lumpinee Stadium || Bangkok, Thailand || Decision || 5 || 3:00
|-  style="background:#cfc;"
| 2016-02-10|| Win ||align=left| Kongsak Sor.Satra || Lumpinee Stadium || Bangkok, Thailand || Decision || 5 || 3:00
|-  style="background:#cfc;"
| 2016-01-16|| Win ||align=left| Noomsurin Chor.Ketveena || Siam Omnoi Boxing Stadium || Thailand || Decision || 5 || 3:00
|-  style="background:#fbb;"
| 2015-12-04|| Loss ||align=left| Petchrung Sitnayokkaipaedriew || Lumpinee Stadium || Bangkok, Thailand || Decision || 5 || 3:00
|-  style="background:#cfc;"
| 2015-11-14|| Win ||align=left| Yodsaenkeng Jor.Nopparat || Lumpinee Stadium || Bangkok, Thailand || Decision || 5 || 3:00
|-  style="background:#fbb;"
| 2015-11-03|| Loss ||align=left| Peemai Erawan || Lumpinee Stadium || Bangkok, Thailand || Decision || 5 || 3:00
|-  style="background:#cfc;"
| 2015-09-29|| Win ||align=left| Peemai Erawan || Lumpinee Stadium || Bangkok, Thailand || Decision || 5 || 3:00
|-  style="background:#cfc;"
| 2015-06-30|| Win ||align=left| Yodpayak Phor.Jaroenpeth || Lumpinee Stadium || Bangkok, Thailand || Decision || 5 || 3:00
|-  style="background:#fbb;"
| 2015-03-02|| Loss ||align=left| Gingsanglek Tor.Laksong || Rajadamnern Stadium || Bangkok, Thailand || Decision || 5 || 3:00
|-  style="background:#cfc;"
| 2015-01-11|| Win ||align=left| Kompai Sor.Jullasen || Lumpinee Stadium || Bangkok, Thailand || KO || 4 ||
|-  style="background:#cfc;"
| 2014-10-24|| Win ||align=left| Phetbansen Sor.Jor.Lekmuangnont || Lumpinee Stadium || Bangkok, Thailand || Decision || 5 || 3:00
 
|-
| colspan=9 | Legend:

References

Tawanchai P.K. Saenchaimuaythaigym
ONE Championship kickboxers
1999 births
Living people
Tawanchai P.K. Saenchaimuaythaigym
ONE Championship champions